Emile Riachi (November 2, 1926 – 15 June 2014) was a renowned orthopaedic surgeon in Lebanon.

Biography 
Riachi was born in Beirut, Lebanon, in 1926.  He graduated from the "Faculté Francaise de Médecine" in Beirut in 1950 as MD and then moved to Chicago to specialize in Orthopaedic Surgery at Cook County Hospital with Professor Hampar Kelikian. Returning to Lebanon, Riachi founded the first service of Orthopaedic Surgery and Traumatology in the Middle-East in 1954, within Beirut's St George Hospital. He was also the founder and first President of the Lebanese Orthopaedic Association.

He was also an honorary member of the SOFCOT, the French Orthopaedic Association.

In 1960, Emile Riachi, founded the Lebanese Ski Federation and became its first President until 1996. Ski au Liban - histoire et evolution - Lebanese Ski Federation. Under his leadership, Lebanon has become a destination for high level ski champions. From 1962 until 1975 when the civil war in Lebanon erupted, the famous championships known as "Semaine Internationale de Ski au Liban" attracted the best champions from alpine countries.

He was also one of the pioneers who founded Faraya Mzaar Kfardebian, Lebanon's most famous ski resort.

Representative scientific publications

Literary writings 
 RIACHI, Emile (2007) Ma Vie Editions Tamyras 
 RIACHI, Emile (2011) "L'Orthopédie à la portée de tous" Dar al Kotob

See also
 Faraya Mzaar Kfardebian
 Skiing in Lebanon

References

External links
  E. Riachi scientific publications (1)
  E. Riachi scientific publications (2)
 Emile Riachi on History of Skiing in Lebanon

2014 deaths
1926 births
People from Beirut
Lebanese orthopedic surgeons